The Morning (2006) is a studio album from Andrew Osenga. It is his second solo full-length studio album, following the short EP Souvenirs and Postcards (2004).

Track listing
  "In Gym Class in High School" – 0:34
  "After the Garden" – 3:51
  "White Dove" – 4:32
  "Following the Blind" – 3:14
  "Farmer's Wife" – 1:11
  "Santa Barbara" – 5:28
  "Dance Away the City" – 4:10
  "Marilyn" – 3:39
  "House of Mirrors" – 4:41
  "Just a Kid" – 1:39
  "Trying to Get This Right" – 5:14
  "All the Wrong Reasons" – 1:15
  "New Beginning" – 5:33
  "Early in the Morning" – 5:59

Credits
 Andrew Osenga—vocals, piano, Hammond organ, baritone, keyboard, acoustic guitar, electric guitar, trombone, trumpet, programming, upright bass, pad, high-strung electric guitar, percussion, mando 12-string, organ, Nord bass
 Cason Cooley—guitar, Rhodes piano, piano, organ, wurlitzer, Nord bass, omnichord
 Will Sayles—drums
 Jeff Irwin—bass guitar
 David Grant—tambourine, percussion
 Paul Eckberg—drums, percussion, ghost hi-hat
 Ken Lewis—drums, percussion loop
 Aaron Sands—bass guitar
 Marcus Myers—hammer dulcimer, bridge bass
 Phil Madeira—Hammond B3
 Chris Weigel—bass guitar
 Paul Moak—vibes, pedal steel, mando 12-string, swells, background vocals
 Jeff Pardo—keyboard
 Garett Buell—tablas, reco-reco, djembe, cacici, udu, genkoge, bayan, bells
 Jeremy Casella—piano, harmony vocals
 Kenny Hutson—pedal steel
 Matthew Perryman Jones—electric guitar
 Ben Shive—key pad, background vocals
 Randall Goodgame—background vocals
 Andrew Peterson—background vocals
 Dean Baylor—background vocals
 Mark Lockett—background vocals
 Chris Mason—background vocals
 Alison Osenga—background vocals

2006 albums
Andrew Osenga albums